Joy Division The Complete BBC Recordings is a collection of the two Peel Sessions recorded by Joy Division, two songs from the BBC Television programme Something Else and a live interview. It was released in 2000. The album was re-released as "Before and After – The BBC Sessions" in 2004, the Joy Division tracks included were the same, but it also contained a New Order album.  The entire track listing of the album was later released as the second disc in the UK edition of The Best of Joy Division in 2008.

Reception
Select gave the album a five out of five rating. Select praised songs that were not included into Joy Division's studio albums such as "Exercise One" and "Sound of Music", referring to them as "about as profound as pop music can be".

Track listing
All tracks written by Joy Division.
LP (SFRSLP094) and CD (SFRSCD094)
 "Exercise One" – 2:32
 "Insight" – 3:53
 "She's Lost Control" – 4:11
 "Transmission" – 3:58
 "Love Will Tear Us Apart" – 3:25
 "Twenty Four Hours" – 4:10
 "Colony" – 4:05
 "Sound of Music" – 4:27
 "Transmission" – 3:18
 "She's Lost Control" – 3:44
 "Ian Curtis & Stephen Morris interviewed by Richard Skinner" – 3:32

Notes
 Tracks 1 to 4 recorded 31 January 1979 at the BBC Studios, Maida Vale, London, first released on The Peel Sessions EP in 1986.
 Tracks 5 to 8 recorded 26 November 1979 at the BBC Studios, Maida Vale, London, first released on The Peel Sessions EP in 1987.
 Tracks 9 to 10 recorded live for Something Else 1 September 1979, previously unreleased.
 Track 11 recorded for Radio One in 1979, previously unreleased.

References

Joy Division compilation albums
Peel Sessions recordings
2000 live albums
2000 compilation albums
Joy Division live albums
Albums produced by Bob Sargeant
Strange Fruit Records live albums
Strange Fruit Records compilation albums